James Newell may refer to:

 James E. Newell (1808–?), member of the Wisconsin State Assembly
 James Michael Newell (1900–1985), WPA artist